Wirrn Isle is a Big Finish Productions audio drama based on the long-running British science fiction television series Doctor Who.

Plot 
The Earth is slowly being repopulated in the year 16127, by the descendants of the Nerva Beacon. But the Wirrn have also come down from the Beacon.

Cast 
The Doctor – Colin Baker
Flip Jackson – Lisa Greenwood
Rohert Buchman – Tim Bentinck
Veronica Buchman – Jenny Funnell
Toasty Buchman – Tessa Nicholson
Iron – Rikki Lawton
Sheer Jawn – Dan Starkey
Dare –  Helen Goldwyn
Paul Dessay – Glynn Sweet

Continuity 
This story is a sequel to the 1975 Fourth Doctor television story The Ark in Space, which introduced the Wirrn. It takes place about forty years later.

Critical reception
Doctor Who Magazine reviewer Matt Michael called the story a "very strong conclusion" to the three-story miniseason.

References

External links 
Wirrn Isle

2012 audio plays
Sixth Doctor audio plays